The 2015–16 Azerbaijan Cup is the 24th season of the annual cup competition in Azerbaijan. The final is set to be played on 25 May 2016.

First round
The First Round games were drawn on 8 October 2015.

Second round
The three winners of the First Round will progress to the Second Round, which was also drawn on 8 October 2015.

Quarterfinals
The eight winners from the Second Round are drawn into four two-legged ties.

Semifinals
The four winners from the Quarterfinals were drawn into two two-legged ties.

Final

Scorers
5 goals:
 Ruslan Qurbanov - Neftchi Baku

4 goals:

 Oleksiy Gai - Gabala
 Míchel - Qarabağ

3 goals:

 Ermin Zec - Gabala
 Samuel Armenteros - Qarabağ
 Nelson Bonilla - Zira

2 goals:

 César Meza - Inter Baku
 Elshan Abdullayev - Neftchi Baku
 Rahman Hajiyev - Neftchi Baku
 Muarem Muarem - Qarabağ
 Sabir Allahquliyev - Qaradağ Lökbatan
 Rahman Musayev - Şərurspor

1 goals:

 Aleksandre Guruli - AZAL
 Facundo Pereyra - Gabala
 Rashad Eyyubov - Gabala
 Vagif Javadov - Gabala
 Asif Mammadov - Gabala
 Rashad Sadiqov - Gabala
 Samir Zargarov - Gabala
 Dodô - Gabala
 Ricardinho - Gabala
 David Meza - Gabala
 Abbas Huseynov - Inter Baku
 Vüqar Nadirov - Inter Baku
 Lasha Kasradze - Inter Baku
 Nika Kvekveskiri - Inter Baku
 Kamran Abdullazadä - Khazar Lankaran
 Ibrahim Gadirzade - Khazar Lankaran
 Vaguf Gulaliyev - Khazar Lankaran
 Tural Qurbatov - Khazar Lankaran
 Räfael Qävami - MOIK Baku
 Araz Abdullayev - Neftchi Baku
 Javid Imamverdiyev - Neftchi Baku
 Magomed Kurbanov - Neftchi Baku
 Fahmin Muradbayli - Neftchi Baku
 Cauê - Neftchi Baku
 Javid Taghiyev - Qarabağ
 Mahir Madatov - Qarabağ
 Reynaldo - Qarabağ
 Richard - Qarabağ
 Dani Quintana - Qarabağ
 Ramazan Abbasov - Ravan Baku
 Vugar Baybalayev - Ravan Baku
 Nuran Gurbanov - Ravan Baku
 Fariz Najafov - Şərurspor
 Aziz Huseynov - Shamkir
 Bahruz Teymurov - Shamkir
 Igrar Semedov - Shahdag
 Pardis Fardjad-Azad - Sumgayit
 Khayal Najafov - Sumgayit
 Tugay Alhüseynli - Turan Tovuz
 Vusal Garaev - Turan Tovuz
 Azer Mammadov - Turan Tovuz
 Nurlan Novruzov - Zira

Own goals:
 Şıxqayıb Şıxqayıbov (14 October 2015 vs Shamkir)
 Rahman Musayev (14 October 2015 vs Qaradağ Lökbatan)
 Säbayıl Bağırov (2 December 2015 vs Inter Baku)

Notes
Qarabağ have played their home games at the Tofiq Bahramov Stadium from 1993 to 2016 due to the ongoing situation in Quzanlı.

References

Azerbaijan Cup seasons
Azerbaijan Cup
Azerbaijan Cup